Aryeh Kosman (1935June 17, 2021) was a scholar of ancient Greek philosophy and a professor of philosophy at Haverford College. Kosman was born in 1935 in Oakland, California. He earned undergraduate and master's degrees from the University of California, Berkeley, and a PhD from Harvard University. He came to Haverford as an assistant professor in 1962, was promoted to full professor in 1973, and was appointed John Whitehead Professor of Philosophy at Haverford in 1984. He retired in 2010.

Publications

References

External links 
 

American scholars of ancient Greek philosophy
Haverford College faculty
American historians of philosophy
Year of birth missing (living people)
University of California, Berkeley alumni
Harvard University alumni